Tyler Luke Fisher (born 19 November 1993) is a South African rugby union player who plays centre for the Utah Warriors in Major League Rugby (MLR).

He previously played for West Harbour RFC in the Shute Shield in Australia.

Career

Youth level
He represented  at various youth levels, from the Under-16 Grant Khomo Week in 2009 to the 2012 Under-19 Provincial Championship.

Sharks

Leopards
He was a member of the  team that won the 2015 Currie Cup First Division. He featured in a total of ten matches during the 2015 Currie Cup qualification rounds and First Division proper and scored seven tries for the side.

Pumas
He moved to the Nelspruit-based  prior to the 2016 season.

S.A. Under-20
He was included in the training group that toured Argentina in preparation for the 2013 IRB Junior World Championship.

References

South African rugby union players
Living people
1993 births
Rugby union centres
Sharks (Currie Cup) players
Leopards (rugby union) players
Pumas (Currie Cup) players
SWD Eagles players
Utah Warriors players
Rugby union players from KwaZulu-Natal